Zoltán Nógrádi (born August 5, 1969) is a Hungarian politician, member of the National Assembly (MP) for Szeged (Csongrád County Constituency II) from 2010 to 2014. He was also a Member of Parliament from Csongrád County Regional List between 2002 and 2006, and from the Fidesz National List from 2006 to 2010.

Nógrádi was elected mayor of Mórahalom on December 11, 1994. He joined Fidesz in 1997. He was a member of the Committee on European Affairs from 27 August 2004 to 5 May 2014.

Personal life

He is married and has two sons.

References

1969 births
Living people
Fidesz politicians
Mayors of places in Hungary
Members of the National Assembly of Hungary (2002–2006)
Members of the National Assembly of Hungary (2006–2010)
Members of the National Assembly of Hungary (2010–2014)
People from Szeged